Broadway Junction may refer to:

 Broadway Junction (New York City Subway), a station
 The Broadway roundabout in Belfast, Northern Ireland, location of RISE (sculpture) 
 Broadway Junction (Brooklyn), a neighborhood of New York City

See also
 Broadway Station (disambiguation) 
 Broadway (disambiguation)